Don't Ask Questions is an EP by the Geneva-based punk rock band Hateful Monday, co-released in 2001 through both Trash Compost Records and PTR. Roughly 500 copies were printed. This is also the last recording to feature bassist Mark Sman. It was produced by Hateful Monday.

Track listing

Personnel 
Hateful Monday
Reverend Seb – vocals, guitar 
Igor Gonzola – drums
Myriam K. - guitar, backing vocals
Mark Sman – bass guitar

Artwork
Diego Fachinotti – design & cover art

Production
Stephane Kroug - mixing
Serge Buffard – mastering, assistant mixing

References

2001 EPs
Hateful Monday albums